Hassanal Bolkiah Mosque is a mosque in Mentiri, a settlement area in Brunei-Muara District of Brunei.

History 
The construction of the mosque began on 2 May 2017 with the foundation laying ceremony held three days later. It was built by the command of Hassanal Bolkiah, the Sultan of Brunei, to replace the previous mosque, the Kampong Mentiri National Housing Scheme Mosque, which was destroyed in a fire on the 5th of the previous month. The construction was completed in just 49 days. It was officially opened by the Sultan on 23 June 2017, held after the inaugural Friday prayers at the mosque.

See also
 List of mosques in Brunei

References 

2017 establishments in Brunei
Mosques completed in 2017
Mosques in Brunei
Brunei-Muara District